Yury Melnichek a Swiss-Belarusian tech-entrepreneur, venture investor and software engineer. Born in Minsk (Belarus), now living in Zurich (Switzerland). Founder of free a cartographic service Maps.me, AIMATTER company (mobile applications Fabby & Fabby Look, acquired by Google). In spring 2018, together with his business partner Andrei Avsievich, founded an investment company Bulba Ventures to invest in Belarusian and ready-to-relocate to Belarus startups. Apart from investment activities Yury provides consulting services in venture investment, mobile applications marketing and also consults IT-companies and startups working with machine learning, computer vision and data science.

Education 
Yury graduated with a degree in applied mathematics and informatics from the Belarusian State University in 2005

Public activities 
Yury was a long-time partner of DOBRA Foundation and Social Weekend – a social project competition and the Open Data Science Belarus community. He also takes part in hackathons as a mentor and speaks at tech conferences.

Bulba Ventures 
In March 2018, Yury, together with his business partner Andrei Avsievich, founded Belarus-based startup investment company Bulba Ventures. Bulba Ventures focuses on machine learning startups and is interested in startups at the intersection of real economy & IT, life & health sciences.

AIMATTER 
AIMATTER was founded in April 2016 and in autumn 2016 launched a neural network-based AI platform and SDK to detect and process images quickly on mobile devices. This was the world's first technology working on mobile devices and in streaming video.

The photo and video app Fabby served as a proof-of-concept of the tech. Fabby became popular among users and was highly reviewed by experts (the app twice became No.1 in its category on ProductHunt). AIMATTER also developed hair segmentation technology during live streaming video that was later introduced in the Fabby Look app.

In August 2017 TechCrunch announced news about Google acquiring AIMATTER. The deal became remarkable for the Belarusian IT industry, because an international publicly trading company acquired a Belarusian legal entity. Terms of the sale were not disclosed.

MAPS.ME 
Today Maps.me is a free cartographic service available on iOS, Android and Blackberry platforms. The company, initially called MapsWithMe, was founded in 2010 with the head office in Zurich and the R&D center in Minsk. Yury launched the project together with Alexander Zolotarev, Victor Govako and Sergey Retchiskiy. Before founding MapsWithMe Yury worked at Google (cartographic service).

MapsWithMe was first released on iOS in April, 2011. In 2012, the service team won first prize at the StartupMonthly competition in Vilnius and won an internship in Silicon Valley. In February 2012, a new update of MapsWithMe was released for Android and in July 2014 the company was renamed to MAPS.ME.

In November 2014 MAPS.ME was acquired by Mail.ru Group who were interested in preserving product independence within its structure and further development of MAPS.ME.

MAPS.ME acquisition garnered a lot of media attention and was featured among the most significant deals of Runet (Lenta.ru, the Runet, VC.ru). "Thanks to this deal the popular cartographic service is now available for free". At the moment of the deal "the app was downloaded more than 7 million times and it was one of the most popular in the “Travel" section in more than 100 countries".

References

External links 
 
 

Living people
Belarusian computer programmers
Year of birth missing (living people)